Maria McCool (born 23 May 1974) is an Irish singer from Gweedore, County Donegal. She is well known for performing old Irish songs in her native Irish and in English. Her albums include Ailleog and Doagh, on which she covered such songs as "Ar Éirinn Ní Neosfainn Cé Hí" and "Song For Ireland". She has received numerous awards at Celtic festivals in Ireland and the UK. In 2007, McCool was married and worked as a national school teacher in Dunshaughlin in County Meath.

McCool grew up as a member of the choir at St. Mary's church in Gweedore, singing alongside Enya, Aoife Ní Fhearraigh, Moya Brennan and other members of Clannad who are also members. Her music teacher at Pobalscoil Ghaoth Dobhair was Baba Brennan, the mother of Clannad and Enya.

McCool took part in the Eurosong competition on The Late Late Show on 24 February 2012, where she performed "Mistaken", written by Edele Lynch. She finished in fifth place.

Discography
Oíche Chiúin (1995)
Ailleog (1997)
Doagh (2009)
Shenandoah (2018)

References

1974 births
Living people
Irish fiddlers
Irish folk singers
Musicians from County Donegal
People from Gweedore
21st-century Irish singers
21st-century Irish women singers
21st-century violinists